Betton is a hamlet in the civil parish of Norton in Hales, in the Shropshire district, in the county of Shropshire, England.

Hamlets in Shropshire